South Korean singer-songwriter, rapper and record producer G-Dragon began his career as a member of South Korean boy band Big Bang. His discography as a solo artist began in 2009, and includes three studio albums, two extended plays, one collaboration album, four live albums and several other singles.

In 2009, G-Dragon released his debut studio album Heartbreaker. Propelled by its lead-single of the same name, an electronic pop song, the album sold over 300,000 copies and went on to win Album of the Year at the 2009 Mnet Asian Music Awards. The second single, "Breathe", manage to chart within the Top 20 while his other songs—"The Leaders", "A Boy", "Hello", and "She's Gone"—went on to top various charts upon their release. In November 2010, YG Entertainment announced a collaboration album between G-Dragon and T.O.P. To promote their album, the duo released three singles: "High High", "Oh Yeah", and "Knock Out" (Korean: 뻑이가요; Revised Romanization: Ppeogigayo). The album debuted at number one on the Gaon Album Chart.

Three years after his debut album, G-Dragon released his first extended play One of a Kind in September 2012. The album was positively received, topping the Billboard World Albums chart and entering the Billboard 200 chart at number 161. At of the end of 2012, the album netted in over 200,000 copies, making it the best selling album by a Korean soloist since the release of his first album Heartbreaker in 2009. The EP won the award for Record of the Year at the 2013 Seoul Music Awards. His second album, Coup d'Etat, was released in September 2013. Six tracks from Coup d'Etat placed within the top 10 of the Gaon Digital Chart with "Who You?" (Korean: 니가 뭔데; Revised Romanization: Niga Mwonde) topping the chart. The album entered the Billboard 200, making G-Dragon the first Korean act to have multiples entries in the chart. The success of Coup d'Etat led to G-Dragon winning Artist of the Year at the 2013 Mnet Asian Music Awards.

After a four-year hiatus as a solo artist, G-Dragon released his second extended play Kwon Ji Yong in June 2017, which spawned the number one single, Untitled, 2014. Other songs from the EP "Super Star" and "Bullshit" charted at number 4 and 6 respectively. The EP surpassed one million copies sold on QQ Music, the biggest online music service in China, in six days, the shortest time ever for any album. In the United States, Kwon Ji Yong became his best-selling album and the first by a Korean soloist to spend multiple weeks atop the Billboard World Albums chart.

Albums

Studio albums

Collaborative albums

Compilation albums

Live albums

Extended plays

Singles

As lead artist

Collaborations

As featured artist

Other charted songs

Notes

See also
 G-Dragon videography
 List of songs written by G-Dragon
 Big Bang discography

References

External links
 Official Website

Discographies of South Korean artists
Discography
K-pop discographies